Xylomelum benthamii is a plant in the woody pear genus of the family Proteaceae.  It was formerly considered a variety of Xylomelum pyriforme.  It is native to south-eastern Queensland, Australia, and was described from material collected on 25 June 1829 on the Brisbane River some 140 km north-west of what is now Brisbane, the state capital.  It was mistakenly linked with the name Xylomelum salicinum (Meisn.) Benth., and was given the replacement name X. benthamii in 2007 by A.E. Orchard, with the specific epithet honouring botanist George Bentham.

References

benthamii
Proteales of Australia
Trees of Australia
Flora of Queensland